The 1965-66 French Rugby Union Championship  was contested by 56 teams divided in 7 pools, The four first teams of each pool and the better for classified fifth were qualified for the "last 32".

The Agen won the Championship 1965-66 after beating Dax in the final and hold the title.

Context 
The 1966 Five Nations Championship was won by Wales thanks to his victory (9-8) against France in the last day.

The Challenge Yves du Manoir was won en 1966 by the Lourdes that beat Mont-de-Marsan 16 - 6.

Qualification round 

In bold the qualified to next round

"Last 32" 

In bold the clubs qualified for the next round

"Last 16" 

In bold the clubs qualified for the next round

Quarter of finals 

In bold the clubs qualified for the next round

Semifinals

Final 

Dax line-up a very young team, with a lot of young people. Dourthe (17 years ols), Arrieumerlou (18 and half), Capdepuy (20) and Benali (18).

The final was signed by a lot of brutalities and violence.

Notes and references

External links
 Finale 1966 finalesrugby.com

1966
France 1966
Championship